The Institute of Fashion Technology Kerala or IFTK-Kollam is a fashion technology institute located at Vellimon in Kollam, India. IFTK-Kollam is first and one of its kind, established by Government of Kerala with the intention of developing professionals for taking up leadership positions in fashion business in the emerging global scenario. IFTK-Kollam is inaugurated by the then honorable Chief Minister Sri.V.S Achuthanandan on 5 April 2010. The academy is in technical collaboration with the National Institute of Fashion Technology (NIFT), Ministry of Textiles, Government of India. The Institute aims at providing a common platform for fashion education, research and training.

Location
The institute is located at the beautiful surroundings of Vellimon in Kollam, about 13.5 km away from Kollam city centre.

Kollam Junction railway station – 13.8 km
Kollam KSRTC Bus Station – 12.8 km
Kollam Port – 17.3 km
Kollam KSWTD Ferry Terminal – 12.8 km
Kundara – 4.7 km
Paravur – 26.5 km

Courses
 Bachelor of Design (B.Des) – Fashion Design

Facilities
 Smart classrooms equipped with most modern facilities
Industrial Visits
 Laboratories
 Resource Center
 Canteen
 Hostel facilities

References

External links
 Institute of Fashion Technology Kerala

Education in Kollam
Organisations based in Kollam
Indian fashion
Fashion schools in India
Design schools in India
2010 establishments in Kerala
Educational institutions established in 2010